Stewart Information Services Corporation (SISCO) is a real estate information, title insurance and transaction management company. Wholly owned subsidiaries, Stewart Title Guaranty Co. and Stewart Title Company offer products and services in the United States and abroad through its direct retail operations, independent agencies in the Stewart Trusted Provider network, and other companies. Stewart Title is headquartered in Houston, Texas, and has approximately 6,350 employees.

Founded by Maco Stewart in 1893 in Galveston, Texas, the company has grown to offer title insurance policies and escrow services in more than 80 countries. In 2014 Stewart Title was recognized by Forbes as one of the 50 Most Trustworthy Financial Companies in America. In 2012, SISCO was nationally recognized in Forbes’ Top 100 Most Trustworthy Companies in the U.S. It was number four on the 2007 FORTUNE magazine’s "America’s Most Admired Companies" in "Mortgage Services". It was also number 703 on the Fortune 1000 list in 2006.

References

External links

Companies listed on the New York Stock Exchange
Real estate companies established in 1893
1893 establishments in Texas
Companies based in Houston
Insurance companies of the United States
Financial services companies established in 1893
Real estate companies of the United States
American companies established in 1893